Untrue may refer to falsehood, or to:

Music
Untrue (album) a 2007 album by Burial

Songs
"Untrue", single by Tchami 2014 
"Untrue", song by Katatonia composed by Blakkheim / Katatonia Brave Yester Days 2004 Sounds of Decay
"Untrue", song by Coal Chamber, composed by Fafara  Rascon  Cox  Foss Chamber Music (Coal Chamber album)
"Untrue", single by The Crows, Bills Davis & George Goldner 1953
"Untrue", song by Don Julian (musician) and The Meadowlarks	1956
"Untrue", song by Crüxshadows from Fortress in Flames 
"Untrue", song by The Missing Links	1965
"Untrue", song by Rock-A-Teens,	  George Donald McGraw		1959
"Untrue", song by Tom Jones written by Gordon Mills	1965
"Untrue", song by Burial from Untrue (album)